Joseph Edward "Jack" Hall (1890 – after 1945) was an English footballer who played as a full back in the Football League for Barnsley, Manchester City and Bristol Rovers. He was on the books of Preston North End, Hull City and Newport County, without playing league football for any of them, and also played non-league football for clubs including Jarrow Croft and Darlington.

References

1890 births
Year of death missing
People from The Boldons
Footballers from Tyne and Wear
English footballers
Association football fullbacks
Preston North End F.C. players
Jarrow F.C. players
Hull City A.F.C. players
Barnsley F.C. players
Manchester City F.C. players
Darlington F.C. players
Bristol Rovers F.C. players
Newport County A.F.C. players
Northern Football League players
English Football League players
Date of birth missing
Place of death missing